View, Inc. is an American glass-manufacturing company that produces a smart glass based on electrochromism.

Founded in 2007, the company is headquartered in Milpitas, California with a manufacturing facility in Olive Branch, Mississippi.

History 
The company was co-founded in April 2007 by Paul Nguyen and Mike Scobey as eChromics, Based in Santa Rosa, California . The company was renamed  Soladigm in October 2007,  and appointed Rao Mulpuri as CEO in December 2008. The firm moved headquarters to Milpitas, California in a reconditioned Seagate Technology factory.

In July 2010, the company announced its intent to start production from a new facility in Olive Branch, Mississippi. The same year, it was one of 12 winners of General Electric's $200 million "Ecomagination Challenge." It received a $3.5 million grant from the U.S. Department of Energy from the American Recovery and Reinvestment Act.

The company name was changed  to View, Inc. in November 2012, and began shipping from its new factory near the end of the third quarter of 2012. In 2015, installing the glass at the new Overstock headquarters in Salt Lake City.

In 2013, Corning led an investment round of $60 million for View. Madrone Capital Partners invested $100 million in the company in January 2014. The company received $150 million in late-stage funding in 2015. Funding was led by the New Zealand Super Fund. In 2019, the OAA installed View Dynamic Glass at its headquarters.

Funding 
In 2007, the company raised a Series A round of funding from Sigma Partners and Khosla Ventures, which later took over control of the company and received preferred shares.  Prior to the company's name change, Soladigm was awarded a grant from the U.S. Department of Energy for $3.5 million, derived from the American Recovery and Reinvestment Act.

In 2013, Corning led an investment round of $60 million for View. Madrone Capital Partners invested $100 million in the company in January 2014. The company received $150 million in late-stage funding in 2015. Funding was led by the New Zealand Super Fund.

In June 2017, BlackRock led a $200 million investment in View, bringing total funding for the company to $700 million.

In 2018, View, Inc. announced a $1.1 Billion investment from the SoftBank Vision Fund.

In May 2022, View, Inc. announced that they may not have sufficient financial resources to meet it’s financial obligations for at least twelve months from the expected issuance date of its 2021 financial statements

Products and technology
The company's product, View Dynamic Glass, is glass with an electrochromic (EC) coating consisting of multiple layers of ceramic metal oxide with a thickness of 1 micron. Low voltage wiring is added so the tint of the glass can be controlled through an app or centralized software system in response to weather or interior temperature. When the low-voltage direct current electrical signal is activated, the layer of materials in the insulating glass changes from transparent to up to 99% tinted for visible wavelengths.

The technology is designed to allow natural light to enter buildings while deflecting glare and infrared radiation when tinted. Each window pane adjusts its tint throughout the day, and has its own IP address allowing the windows to be controlled from an app. The intensity of the tint can be adjusted to control glare, direct sunlight coming in, and to modify privacy.

By 2016, the company made panels that could be retrofitted as well as panels based on builders' specifications.

In 2018, the firm partnered with Microsoft Azure IoT to develop a physical security system that notifies building managers when glass breaks.

Litigation
In January 2009, Nguyen was removed as CTO and fired the next month. He filed the suit against the company in January 2010, seeking to invalidate rounds of financing by the company and challenging his firing as a violation of the company's certificate of incorporate and voting agreement. The parties agreed to arbitration, and in December 2015, the arbitrator ruled in Nguyen's favor, which, as the judge in subsequent litigation said, "essentially blew up View’s extant capital structure".

In Feb 2018, litigation reached a settlement after investor challenge, securing the company's capital structure; a proposal to amend Delaware's corporate law emerged from the difficult facts of the case.

In December 2012, SAGE Electrochromics filed a patent infringement suit against View; View counter-sued a few months later.

References

External links 
 

2006 establishments in California
Companies based in Milpitas, California
Technology companies established in 2006
Companies listed on the Nasdaq
Glassmaking companies of the United States
Technology companies of the United States
Technology companies based in Greater Los Angeles
Softbank portfolio companies